Devonish is a surname. Notable people with the surname include:

 Asnoldo Devonish (1932–1997), Venezuelan long jumper and triple jumper
 Marlon Devonish  (born 1976), English sprinter
 Nicole Devonish (born 1973), Canadian long jumper

See also
 Devenish (disambiguation)